The Houston Story is a 1956 American crime film noir directed by William Castle and starring Gene Barry, Barbara Hale and Edward Arnold.

Plot
Frank Duncan (Barry), a shrewd oil driller from Galveston, Texas, conceives a plan to sneakily siphon millions of dollars' worth of oil from the oil fields and sell it as his own. He goes through nightclub singer Zoe Crane (Hale) to insinuate himself with a Houston mobster, Paul Atlas (Arnold) to get financing for his scheme.

Atlas tells right-hand man Gordon Shay privately that he plans to double-cross Duncan as soon as the money's in hand. Chris Barker, a gunman, robs Duncan and intends to murder him, but Duncan is able to push Barker off an oil rig to his death.

Duncan tries to make a getaway with the help of true-blue girlfriend Madge, but the hard-hearted Zoe steals his money and lies to Madge that Duncan has betrayed her. A pair of Atlas's thugs snatch Zoe, take her money and toss her from a moving car. Shay is killed, but before Duncan can get away, the cops close in on him and he's forced to surrender.

Cast
 Gene Barry as Frank Duncan
 Barbara Hale as Zoe Crane
 Edward Arnold as Paul Atlas
 Paul Richards as Gordon Shay
 Jeanne Cooper as Madge
 Frank Jenks as Louie Phelan
 John Zaremba as Emile Constant
 Chris Alcaide as Chris Barker
 Jack Littlefield as Willie Lucas (as Jack V. Littlefield)
 Paul Levitt as Duke
 Fred Krone as Marsh
 Pete Kellett as Kalo

Production
The film went through a major casting change while in production on location in Houston. Originally set for the lead role was acclaimed character actor Lee J. Cobb. But Cobb suffered a heart attack on May 8 after filming an exhausting fight sequence, in part due to the heat in Texas, where the scene was shot. Cobb was not able to work for the three more days of location scenes on the schedule. Director William Castle, who resembled Cobb, doubled for him in these scenes. Ten weeks later Cobb had recovered enough to return to work. However he then suffered another heart attack and had to be replaced.

Cobb's part had to be recast and according to Castle, producer Sam Katzman "insisted on a relatively new actor in pictures - Gene Barry, a fine actor, but as unlike Lee J. Cobb as anyone could be."

Castle says footage of himself and Cobb remains in the final film.

The film's sets were designed by the art director Paul Palmentola.

See also
List of American films of 1956

References

External links

 
 
 

1956 films
1956 crime films
American crime films
American black-and-white films
Film noir
Columbia Pictures films
Films directed by William Castle
Films set in Houston
Works about petroleum
1950s English-language films
1950s American films